The Association Nationale pour le Développement des Arts de la Mode  (English: National Association for the Development of the Fashion Arts) commonly known as ANDAM,  is a nonprofit association created 1989, which organizes a contest intended to identify each year and launch designers on the scene of the French and international fashion.

History 
Nathalie Dufour founded ANDAM in 1989 under the auspices of Pierre Bergé, its president ever, and immediately received the support of the Delegation to the visual arts French Ministry of Culture and Communication, and DEFI, the development Committee and promotional clothing. Its creation represents a milestone in the history of international fashion and contributed to the advent of the biggest names in fashion.

Direction 
Pierre Bergé President
 Nathalie Dufour, founder and director
 Pierre Oudart, director in charge of art, Ministry of Culture
 Didier Grumbach, president of the French Federation of Couture
 Bruno Geeraert, head of the textile, fashion and luxury to the Ministry of Industry
 Clarisse Reille, Executive Director of the DEFI
 Dominique Jacomet, director of the French Fashion Institute
 Beatrice Salmon, Director of Musée des Arts Décoratifs

20th anniversary 
In 2009, to celebrate the 20th ANDAM anniversary, the association co-publish a novel collection called  Modernes (English: Moderns), a rare and detailed document showing the great phenomena of the style of the past twenty years based on the work of the winners of the ANDAM.

Florence Müller, a French author and fashion historian, it delivers an accurate analysis of different aspects of fashion that is both modern and universal. The ANDAM says Pierre-François Letué, graphic artist, book design and gives carte blanche to fashion photographer Jean-François Lepage to create a photographic series on the creation of the 80 winners.

ANDAM Fashion Award 

The ANDAM Award is an award created over the years as a reference for professionals in the middle and in the international press. In addition to winning ways with a sustainable development and global visibility, it opens the doors of Official calendar of Paris Fashion Week, and is distinguished by its determination to boost the fashion industry in France.

If the contest ANDAM has long been devoted to European residents in France, its openness to international applications authorized since 2005, enabling it to compete with the best prices for international fashion as those awarded by the CFDA, the Fashion Fringe or the New Gen...
In 2012, the ANDAM Award reached the sum of € 230 000 and opens the second edition of the First Series, with the € 60 000, L'Express Styles.

Partnership 
Thought of as a club patrons investors ANDAM allows major international fashion companies to invest in a credit search for young talents and also to ensure the renewal and future of their creative forces.

Partners 
Yves Saint Laurent
Fondation Pierre Bergé - Yves Saint Laurent
Galeries Lafayette
Longchamp
LVMH - Moët Hennessy Louis Vuitton
Only The Brave
HBC
Swarovski
 Thecorner.com, powered by Yoox
Fashion GPS

References

External links
 —Official  ANDAM−Association Nationale pour le Développement des Arts de la Mode website

French fashion
Fashion organizations
Arts organizations based in France
Nationale pour le Developpement des Arts de la Mode
Organizations based in Paris
Arts organizations established in 1989
1989 establishments in France
Fashion awards
Lifetime achievement awards